Constantin Borăscu (born 30 January 1974) is a Romanian wrestler. He competed in the men's Greco-Roman 58 kg at the 2000 Summer Olympics.

References

External links
 

1974 births
Living people
Romanian male sport wrestlers
Olympic wrestlers of Romania
Wrestlers at the 2000 Summer Olympics
Sportspeople from Craiova